Castlebar was a constituency represented in the Irish House of Commons from 1614 to 1800. The area is in County Mayo. Between 1725 and 1793 Catholics and those who were married to Catholics could not vote.

History
In the Patriot Parliament of 1689 summoned by James II, Castlebar was represented with two members.

Members of Parliament, 1613–1801
1613–1615 Sir John Bingham and Thomas Peyton
1634–1635 Sir Henry Bingham, 1st Bt
1639–1648 Sir Henry Bingham, 1st Bt and Sir George Carr
1661–1666 Sir George Bingham, 2nd Bt and William Rowse (AWOL and replaced 1665 by Sir Hugh Middleton, 3rd Baronet)

1689–1801

Notes

References

Bibliography

Castlebar
Constituencies of the Parliament of Ireland (pre-1801)
Historic constituencies in County Mayo
1614 establishments in Ireland
1800 disestablishments in Ireland
Constituencies established in 1614
Constituencies disestablished in 1800